Leticia Gil Parra (born 1 August 1982) is a road cyclist from Spain. She represented her nation at the 2008 UCI Road World Championships.

References

External links
 profile at Procyclingstats.com

1982 births
Spanish female cyclists
Living people
Place of birth missing (living people)
Cyclists from Madrid